David Hickinbottom is a British figure skater who competed in ice dance.

Partnered with Janet Sawbridge, he won bronze at the 1964 World Figure Skating Championships and silver at the 1965 World Figure Skating Championships.

Competitive highlights 
With Janet Sawbridge

References 

British male ice dancers